Bury Me an Angel is a 1971 American biker film from female director Barbara Peeters, who was script supervisor on Angels Die Hard (1970). She was the first woman to direct a biker film. The film was acquired by Roger Corman's New World Pictures.

Plot
A female biker (Dixie Peabody) seeks to avenge the death of her brother.

Production
Barbara Peeters first conceived the idea for the film when, while working on Richard Compton's biker drama Angels Die Hard, supporting player Rita Murray told her she was looking to produce films of her own. Peeters invented the plot on the spot, and rush-wrote a first draft to present to Murray and her investors days later.  Beach Dickerson has a small role and helped produce the movie, which was shot on location in California. The script's original title was The Hunt.

See also
 List of American films of 1971

References

External links

 
 
Bury Me an Angel at Trailers from Hell

1971 films
1970s exploitation films
1970s English-language films
Outlaw biker films
New World Pictures films
American exploitation films
Films directed by Barbara Peeters
1970s American films